Carl Coulter (born November 14, 1966) is a former professional Canadian football offensive lineman. He played 15 seasons in the Canadian Football League for six different teams. He was named CFL All-Star in 1998 and was a part of one Grey Cup championship team with the Hamilton Tiger-Cats in 1999. Coulter played CIS football for the Carleton Ravens. After a football career he moved on to teaching at elementary schools and doing construction work in Ottawa.

External links
 Carl Coulter biography on Hamilton Tiger-Cats official site

1966 births
Living people
BC Lions players
Canadian football offensive linemen
Carleton Ravens football players
Hamilton Tiger-Cats players
Ottawa Renegades players
Ottawa Rough Riders players
Sportspeople from Kawartha Lakes
Players of Canadian football from Ontario
Saskatchewan Roughriders players
Toronto Argonauts players